Juliana Roma "Julie" Dzerowicz  is a Canadian politician. A member of the Liberal Party, she has represented the Toronto riding of Davenport in the House of Commons of Canada since her initial election in 2015, and was subsequently reelected in 2019 and in 2021.

Education 
Dzerowicz graduated from McGill University with a bachelor of commerce. She completed her final term at Institut Commercial de Nancy in France. She was heavily involved in leadership roles at McGill, and served as the vice-president internal of the Students' Society of McGill University. She received the Scarlet Key Award, which is awarded to "students who have demonstrated indubitable qualities of leadership, unselfishness and perseverance by their outstanding contributions to the McGill community."  After completing a master of business administration at the University of British Columbia (UBC), where she served on the UBC Senate, Dzerowicz finished her degree at the London Business School.

Career

Pre-2015 
In 2007, Dzerowicz co-founded an environment charity called Project Neutral. She was also a founding board member of JUMP Math, a non-profit numeracy program.

Prior to her election, Dzerowicz worked as the director of strategic planning and communication at the Bank of Montreal, as a senior political staffer to former provincial cabinet minister Gerry Phillips, as the vice-chair of the Platform Committee for the Ontario Liberal Party and in biotechnology.

As a Member of Parliament 
After a lengthy nomination process in 2015, Dzerowicz successfully secured the Liberal Party of Canada's nomination as the Liberal candidate in the riding of Davenport. In October 2015, she became the first female Member of Parliament for Davenport.

In 2017 Dzerowicz was mocked for a copy-paste post about LGBTQ solidarity where she forgot to add the name of her riding.

In February 2021, Dzerowicz introduced a private member's bill, Bill C-273, into the House of Commons of Canada calling upon the Minister of Finance to develop a national strategy for a guaranteed basic income.

In June 2021, Dzerowicz invited constituents to ask her questions via the Reddit discussion website. During the online conversation she was criticized for wrongly stating on Twitter that the 2020 Port of Montreal strike had lasted 2.5 years, and for another tweet in which The Hill Times stated she was mocking a constituent who asked about the Canadian government's legal fight with survivors of Canada's residential school system. Dzerowicz's calls for more funding for affordable housing and universal basic income were better received. Dzerowicz did not answer questions about the Canadian Radio-television and Telecommunications Commission wholesale internet rates or the government's change of policy away from electoral reform.

Following the 2021 Canadian Federal Election Dzerowicz was re-elected to represent Davenport.  A recount was requested by NDP's Alejandra Bravo. Dzerowicz won by 76 votes.

In December 2021 Dzerowicz, acting as the chair of the Liberal Immigration caucus, responded to criticism from within her own party about delays to processing immigration claims, stating that work needs to be done and committing to future improvements.

Electoral record

References

External links
 
 http://www.ourcommons.ca/Parliamentarians/en/members/Julie-Dzerowicz

Living people
Liberal Party of Canada MPs
Members of the House of Commons of Canada from Ontario
Women members of the House of Commons of Canada
Canadian people of Basque descent
Canadian people of Ukrainian descent
McGill University Faculty of Management alumni
People from Old Toronto
Politicians from Toronto
University of British Columbia alumni
Women in Ontario politics
Canadian women civil servants
21st-century Canadian politicians
21st-century Canadian women politicians
1979 births